The Basketball Federation of India (BFI) is the governing and controlling body of basketball in India. It is responsible for the development and promotion of the sports authority of India at all levels. BFI manages all the national-level basketball operations in India and sports authority of India is also undertaking basketball federation of India. It is involved in organizing training camps and national tournaments, and in preparing Indian teams for both men's and women's international competitions in various age categories. The national team of India is also known as the ′Young Cagers′.

History
First national level tournaments were organized in India in 1934. The India national basketball team became a member of FIBA in 1936. The governing body, BFI, was formed in 1950.  Poonam Mahajan was the president (and also the first female president) of Basketball Federation of India. The current head of BFI is K Govindraj.

National teams

Senior 
Men's Senior
 India men's national basketball team
 India men's national 3x3 team

Women's senior
 India women's national basketball team
 India women's national 3x3 team

Age group 
Boys'
 India men's national under-18 basketball team
 India men's national under-16 basketball team

Girls'
 India women's national under-18 basketball team
 India women's national under-16 basketball team

Professional leagues

5x5 format
 Elite Pro Basketball League (formally UBA Pro League)
 National Basketball Championship (men), National Basketball Championship (women)
 ISBL/ICBL (Indian School Basketball League and Indian College Basketball League)

3x3 format
 3X3BL (Men's & Women's) (BFI affiliated)
 INBL

Recognition
The Indian basketball players have also won several trophies for their country. There are 17 Indian basketball players who have been honored by the Government of India through the Arjuna Award. Two players have been bestowed with Dhyan Chand Awards for lifetime achievement.

Sponsorship
Nivia Sports - ( Official ball Partner 2021- Present)

See also
 Sports in India
 UBA Pro Basketball League
 INBL
 3BL
 Mizoram Super League

References

External links
 
 Asia-Basket

Sports governing bodies in India
Basketball governing bodies in Asia
Basketball in India
Sports organizations established in 1950
1950 establishments in India